Das Kleine Gespenst (English: The Little Ghost. Swiss German: S’Chline Gspängst) is a German-Swiss film based on the children's book of the same name, by Otfried Preußler.  The film was released in two language versions: German and Swiss German. The German premiere was on October 14, 2013 at the Schlingel International Film Festival in Chemnitz. The Swiss dialect version was released on September 26, 2013 in the cinemas of German-speaking Switzerland. The theatrical release in Germany was on November 7, 2013. The German-language DVD and Blu-ray were released on April 11, 2014.

References

External links 
 

2010s fantasy comedy films
2010s ghost films
German comedy films
German fantasy films
German children's films
Swiss children's films
2010s German-language films
Swiss German-language films
Films with live action and animation
2010s children's fantasy films
Films based on children's books
Films based on German novels
Films set in castles
2013 comedy films
2013 films
2010s German films